Gary Sullivan may refer to:

Gary Sullivan (engineer), American electrical engineer that led the development of international video and image coding standards
Gary Sullivan (poet), American poet credited with coining the term "Flarf poetry", and writing early examples of the genre
Gary Sullivan (radio), American radio host of a  home improvement talk radio program
Gary Sullivan (rugby league), Australian rugby league footballer of the 1960s and 1970s
Gary Sullivan (soccer) (born 1982), American soccer player for the Long Island Rough Riders and Colorado Rapids
Gary Sullivan, the New Zealand drummer who has played with Dimmer, JPSE, Chug, The Adults and The Stereo Bus
Gary Sullivan (restaurateur), Boston restaurateur

See also 
At Home with Gary Sullivan